Argile Asa Smith Jr. (born July 9, 1955) is an American clergyman and academic administrator who served as interim president of Louisiana Christian University from August 2014 to April 2015.

Background

Born in Poplarville, Mississippi, Smith received a B.A. in Religion from William Carey College in 1977 and a Master of Divinity and Ph.D. from New Orleans Baptist Theological Seminary, thereafter remaining at the seminary as a professor for fourteen years. He became dean of the Southern Baptist-affiliated Louisiana College in 2011, and interim president in August 2014. In 2015, Smith was succeeded as president by Rick Brewer.

References

1955 births
Living people
People from Poplarville, Mississippi
Writers from New Orleans
People from Biloxi, Mississippi
People from Pineville, Louisiana
Presidents of Louisiana Christian University
William Carey University alumni
New Orleans Baptist Theological Seminary alumni
New Orleans Baptist Theological Seminary faculty
American non-fiction writers
Baptist ministers from the United States
Baptists from Mississippi
Baptists from Louisiana